Natasza Zurek (born 4 March 1978) is a Canadian snowboarder. She competed at the 1998 Winter Olympics and the 2002 Winter Olympics.

References

1978 births
Living people
Canadian female snowboarders
Olympic snowboarders of Canada
Snowboarders at the 1998 Winter Olympics
Snowboarders at the 2002 Winter Olympics
Sportspeople from Zakopane